The 1968 Dayton Flyers football team represented the University of Dayton as an independent during the 1968 NCAA University Division football season. Led by fourth-year head coach John McVay, the Flyers compiled a record of 5–5.

Schedule

References

Dayton
Dayton Flyers football seasons
Dayton Flyers football